The Carpe Diem String Quartet was founded in 2005 and is a classical string quartet based in Columbus, Ohio. The quartet's repertoire ranges from classical to contemporary chamber music. They regularly perform the works of contemporaries like Reza Vali, Richard Danielpour, Jonathan Leshnoff, Jessie Montgomery, Osvaldo Golijov, Gunther Schuller, Erberk Eryilmaz, Bruce Wolosoff, and Korine Fujiwara, as well as the works of classical composers such as Wolfgang Amadeus Mozart, Ludwig van Beethoven, Felix Mendelssohn, Joseph Haydn and countless others.  Carpe Diem performs and tours regularly, in the United States, Canada, Japan, China, and Europe. The quartet is a strong proponent for the overlooked Russian composer Sergei Taneyev, and recorded his nine (9) string quartets, as well as his viola quintet, all for the Naxos label. The quartet regularly performs and collaborates with non-classical artists, including Willy Porter and Jayme Stone. A few of the outstanding artists with whom the quartet has played include Yo-Yo Ma, David Krakuaer, Raul Juarena, and Richard Stoltzman.

Commitments

Current and future 

Carpe Diem is the resident ensemble for Concerts In The Barn music festival in Quilcene, WA. The quartet has been the resident ensemble for two years in Siena, Italy at the Accademia Chigiana and performs regularly for the Snake River Music Festival. The quartet has worked extensively with esteemed composer Reza Vali, commissioning through Chamber Music America a major work, Raak, which was premiered at Carnegie Hall, and recording all of his music for string quartet on three (3) CDs. The quartet has recently worked with Richard Danielpour, performing his 6th string quartet and serving as the ensemble in residence for the Sienna International Composition program. Carpe Diem commissioned Jonathan Leshnoff's 4th string quartet, and recently released a CD featuring Leshnoff's 3rd and 4th string quartets, and his Four Dances for string quartet. Bruce Wolosoff, whose eighteen-movement piece entitled "Songs without Words" was commissioned, premiered, and recorded by the quartet.  In January 2009, the quartet performed in New York City, New York, with the Columbus Dance Theater, followed by a tour in Texas.  In early February the quartet toured in Colorado before reuniting with acclaimed accordionist and bandoneonist Peter Soave for a tour in Michigan and Ohio from late February to early March. They concluded their 2008-2009 season with a critically acclaimed concert at the University of Cincinnati's College-Conservatory of Music.  For several weeks spanning between July and August, the quartet performed in Denver, Colorado, and participated in the Snake River Music Festival in Dillon and Keystone.

The quartet opened the 2009-2010 season at their new venue: the Harrison Park clubhouse which is situated on the banks of the Olentangy River near the Short North and Victorian Village neighborhoods, all of which are just outside downtown Columbus.

The quartet traveled to New York City to perform at the trendy club Le Poisson Rouge in January 2010.  Also during the trip, they performed at WNYC's Greene Space, the Nabi Gallery, and were featured at APAP and CMA showcases. The quartet closed off the month with concerts in Detroit and at Southern Illinois University.  In the Spring, CDSQ returned to the University of Cincinnati for a week-long camp of classes and performances.  The quartet once again spent parts of July and August in Colorado as part of the Snake River Music Festival.

Willy Porter 

One of the quartet's most important non-classical collaborations has been with singer-songwriter Willy Porter.  Writes one reviewer: "Willy Porter is an “active” guitarist. That is, he boasts some serious chops, his style is percussive and intricate, and he often employs complex, syncopated grooves, a la Leo Kottke."  The quartet began working with Porter in early 2010, the result was the recording of a live performance in Columbus.  Since then, Porter and the quartet have performed together across the Midwest to critical acclaim.  Porter and Carpe Diem have released two CDs, Live from BoMA and Human Kindness. Porter of the quartet says: “I think this quartet represents a new breed of classical musicians in that they’re not ‘married to the page.’”

Columbus Dance Theater 

CDSQ has enjoyed a strong partnership with the Columbus Dance Theatre (CDT).  Together, the two groups have performed concurrently and consistently in Columbus and beyond.  This collaboration has produced multiple world premieres, including Claudel, a ballet based on the life of the sculptress Camille Claudel, Anne Frank, based on her life, Hamlet, and Entangled Banks.

Educational Outreach 

Like many musical organizations, the quartet is dedicated to sharing the joy of music - particularly chamber music. During their free time, the quartet continues to work with schools and arts groups to foster kids' love of music. Their concerts are interactive and hands-on for the students and relate to core academic classes. The quartet has launched two new programs: Musicare and Music Goes to School, which enable the quartet to bring music to everyone in the Central Ohio area, regardless of their means or circumstances. Of special note, in the spring of 2008, the quartet performed for the Great Lakes Caravan, which brings professional musicians to low-income communities in the Great Lakes region.

For one week in August 2009, the quartet worked with 16 students during violinist Charles Wetherbee's Scale the Summit music camp. Though in its first year, the camp was hugely successful and very well received, it concluded with performances by both student-only ensembles and also ensembles including members of CDSQ.

In November 2009, the quartet embarked on a two-week trip to Tokyo, Japan, where they worked closely with the music students of Rikkyo University and performed with them in Japan's premier Suntory Hall.  The quartet performed to critical acclaim and was eagerly invited back.

Recordings 

The quartet has worked extensively to record works by Russian composer Sergei Taneyev; five (5) CDs of Taneyev's String Quartets 1 - 9, and his viola quintet, are available under the Naxos label. In the summer of 2009, CDSQ recorded "Montana" and "Entangled Banks," both composed by violist Korine Fujiwara, for an upcoming CD.  "Songs Without Words," composed by Bruce Wolosoff for the quartet, was successfully recorded earlier in 2009 and has been made available for digital download on Naxos's website.  Physical CDs of the recording were released in December 2010.

A huge honor for the Carpe Diem String Quartet was when they received nominations for the 2009 Grammy Awards in four categories: Best Classical Album, Best Chamber Music Performance, Best New Artist, and Best Engineered Album- Classical.

Carpe Diem's discography includes:

 Taneyev, String Quartets volumes 1 - 5 (Naxos)
 Jonathan Leshnoff, String Quartets 3, 4 and Four Dances (MSR)
 Jonathan Leshnoff, String Quartet No. 1 (Naxos)
 Jonathan Leshnoff, String Quartet No. 2 (Naxos)
 Trickster Tales, music of John Gunther 
 Jeff Midkiff, music for mandolin and string quartet (Seize the Music)
 Reza Vali , The Book of Calligraphy (Albany)
 Reza Vali, Longing (MSR)
 Human Kindness, music of Willy Porter (Weasel Records)
 Seize the Day, music of Richard Smoot (Sound Endeavors)
Positive Energy, music by Mendelssohn, Monti, Bradley Sowash, Astor Piazzolla, and traditional (Seize the Music)
Montana, music by Korine Fujiwara (Seize the Music)
Songs without Words by Bruce Wolosoff (Naxos)
Live at BoMA by Willy Porter and Carpe Diem String Quartet (Weasel Records)

References

External links
www.carpediemstringquartet.com, CDSQ's official website
CDSQ's YouTube channel
Composer Bruce Wolosoff's official website
Naxos's official website
Harrison Park

Musical groups from Columbus, Ohio
American string quartets
Musical groups established in 2005
2005 establishments in Ohio